El Papalonal Airport  is an airstrip serving the village of El Papalonal in León Department, Nicaragua

In 1981, American intelligence officials discovered that the airstrip was used as a departure point for aircraft delivering weapons to El Salvadorian rebels.

See also

 List of airports in Nicaragua
 Transport in Nicaragua

References

External links
 HERE Maps - El Papalonal
 OpenStreetMap - El Papalonal
 OurAirports - El Papalonal
 El Papalonal

Airports in Nicaragua